Kilmarnock Burghs was a district of burghs constituency of the House of Commons of the Parliament of the United Kingdom from 1832 to 1918. It elected one Member of Parliament (MP) by the first-past-the-post voting system.

Kilmarnock county constituency was created when the district of burghs constituency was abolished.

Boundaries
The constituency consisted of five parliamentary burghs: Kilmarnock in the county of Ayr, Dumbarton in the county of Dumbarton, Rutherglen in the county of Lanark and Renfrew and Port Glasgow in the county of Renfrew.

The Kilmarnock burgh was previously within the Ayrshire constituency and Port Glasgow was previously within the Renfrewshire constituency. Dumbarton, Rutherglen and Renfrew were transferred from Glasgow Burghs.

In 1918 the burgh of Kilmarnock was merged into the then new Kilmarnock county constituency, which included areas previously within North Ayrshire and South Ayrshire. The new Kilmarnock constituency consisted of "The county district of Kilmarnock, inclusive of all burghs situated therein except in so far as included in the Ayr District of Burghs." The burgh of Dumbarton was transferred to Dumbarton Burghs, the burgh of Port Glasgow was merged into West Renfrewshire, the burgh of Renfrew into East Renfrewshire and the burgh of Rutherglen into the Rutherglen constituency.

Members of Parliament

Election results

Elections in the 1830s

Elections in the 1840s

Johnston's death caused a by-election.

Elections in the 1850s

Pleydell-Bouverie was appointed Vice-President of the Board of Trade, requiring a by-election.

Pleydell-Bouverie was appointed President of the Poor Law Board, requiring a by-election.

Elections in the 1860s

Elections in the 1870s

Elections in the 1880s

Elections in the 1890s

Elections in the 1900s

Elections in the 1910s

See also
 Former United Kingdom Parliament constituencies

References

Historic parliamentary constituencies in Scotland (Westminster)
Constituencies of the Parliament of the United Kingdom established in 1832
Constituencies of the Parliament of the United Kingdom disestablished in 1918
Politics of Kilmarnock